A puzzle ring is a jewelry ring made up of multiple interconnected bands, which is a type of mechanical puzzle most likely developed as an elaboration of the European gimmal ring.

The puzzle ring is also sometimes called a "Turkish wedding ring" or "harem ring."  According to popular legend, the ring would be given by the husband as a wedding ring, because if the wife removed it (presumably to commit adultery), the bands of the ring would fall apart, and she would be unable to reassemble it before its absence would be noticed.  However, a puzzle ring can be easily removed without the bands falling apart.

In Sweden, Norway and Finland, puzzle rings are often carried by military veterans (in Norway the rings are often called the "Lebanon ring" after military people have served in the United Nations Interim Forces in Lebanon UNIFIL), where the number of rings correspond to the number of tours made, starting at 4 rings for 1 tour (mostly for Sweden, not usually for Norwegian veterans). In Finland you can use the ring if you have served more than 6 months.

References

Mechanical puzzles
Rings (jewellery)